Scaevola chrysopogon is a species of flowering plant in the family Goodeniaceae. It is a small, understorey  shrub with fan-shaped cream or white flowers and is endemic to Western Australia.

Description
Flowering occurs from August to October.

Taxonomy and naming
Scaevola chrysopogon was first formally described in 1990 by Roger Charles Carolin and the description was published in Telopea. The specific epithet (chrysopogon)  means "golden" and "bearded".

Distribution
This scaevola grows near Shark Bay and south to Wannoo in Western Australia.

References

 

chryspogon
Flora of Western Australia